James McGrath (born 1977) is an Irish former hurling referee. Born in Turin, County Westmeath, he has become one of the top referees over the last few years and has officiated at several big championship matches at all levels. He is a member of the Turin club.

In August 2018, McGrath announced his retirement from refereeing.	
His decision to retire was prompted by not being picked to referee the 2018 All-Ireland Hurling Final.

Now he is the Deputy Principal of Castlepollard Community College.

References

1977 births
Living people
All-Ireland Senior Hurling Championship Final referees
Turin hurlers
Hurling referees
Hurling managers